Charles Edwin Kaulbach (July 13, 1834 – May 25, 1907) was a merchant, ship owner and political figure in Nova Scotia, Canada. He represented Lunenburg in the House of Commons of Canada from 1878 to 1882, from 1883 to 1887 and from 1891 to 1904 as a Conservative member.

Early life and education
He was born in Lunenburg, Nova Scotia, the son of John H. Kaulbach, who was high sheriff for Lunenburg, and Sophia Fredericka Newman. He was educated in Lunenburg.

Career
Kaulbach was a lieutenant-colonel in the militia and also served as high sheriff for Lunenburg. He was also a director of the Lunenburg Marine Insurance Company. He was defeated in the 1882 general election but won a subsequent by-election held in 1883 after the election results were appealed. Kaulbach was defeated in bids for reelection in 1887 and 1904. He died in Halifax, Nova Scotia at the age of 72.

Personal life
His older brother Henry served in the provincial assembly and the Senate of Canada.

Electoral record

References 

1834 births
1907 deaths
Conservative Party of Canada (1867–1942) MPs
Members of the House of Commons of Canada from Nova Scotia